Dan Brodie is an Australian singer and songwriter from Melbourne, Australia, best known for his prolific solo career, during which he has released seven studio. 

In addition to releasing his own albums, Brodie's songs have been recorded by other artists including two songs on Love Is Mighty Close, a Vika and Linda Bull Album. Also in 2010 Brodie appeared on the Paul Kelly produced Maurice Frawley tribute album, Long Gone Whistle – The Songs of Maurice Frawley, performing the Frawley track, "Roll me" to a sold out audience at the Esplanade Hotel in St Kilda.

Early life
Born in Melbourne, Australia, Brodie was raised in a musical family, his father, a professional guitarist and singer taught Brodie the basic chords of guitar. With his brother Chris Brodie (Dallas Crane), they began playing in bands together, honing their skills of playing live to audiences around the outer eastern suburbs of Melbourne before landing their first pub show whilst still in their early teens at the Richmond Club Hotel in 1990. 

Over the next five years, Brodie performed around Melbourne, recording his first proper Album in a student run studio at Monash University in Clayton in 1993, released on tape and sold at live shows. After a move to the inner-city in 1996, Brodie joined dirty swamp rockers, Luxedo, on bass, the line-up also including Tom Carlyon on lead guitar and vocals, Emilie Martin on violin and guitar and Jamie Coghill on drums, contributing to the debut LP, Beauty Queen and the follow up, City Lights and Roadkill departing in 2001 to concentrate on his solo career.

Career

1998-2000: I'm Floatin' Mamma and Big Black Guitar
A five track EP, I'm Floatin' Mamma was independently released in 1998; followed by debut album, Big Black Guitar in 1999. Backed by The Broken Arrows which featured his brother Chris Brodie on slide guitar, Craig Williamson (These Immortal Souls) on drums and Dan Kelly on bass, Brodie signed to EMI who re-released his debut album. Both the EP and debut album were produced by Maurice Frawley and engineered by Dave McCluney at Atlantis Studios in Melbourne.

2001-2004: Make Me Wanna Kill and Empty Arms, Broken Hearts
In 2001, Brodie released a four track EP featuring songs recorded for his forthcoming unreleased album, as well as some from earlier demos. 

Brodie's second album, Empty Arms, Broken Hearts was released in 2002. Containing the singles "Jesus, Try and Save Me", "Take a Bullet" and "Hope That We Get Home Tonight", the album was nominated for two ARIA Music Awards.

2005-2009: Beautiful Crimes
Brodie's solo album entitled Beautiful Crimes was released in 2005 that veered away from country into a more indie rock sound and was produced by Barry Palmer of Hunters and Collectors, releasing the two radio friendly power-pop rock anthems, "Wanna Shine" and "Sweetheart".

Brodie took an extended break from touring with a band and spent several months playing solo shows across the Americans.

2010-2011: My Friend The Murderer
Brodie returned to Australia to record My Friend The Murderer which was released in 2011. The album was recorded at Headgap Studios in Melbourne, Australia by Brent "Sloth" Punshon and for the first time showed off Brodie's newly formed backing band, the Grieving Widows, featuring Chris Brodie on bass and Dave Nicholls on drums.

2012-2014: Deep Deep Love and Run Yourself Ragged EP
Brodie completed work on his fifth album Deep Deep Love in 2012 before a diagnosis of Hodgkins Lymphoma and subsequent treatment of chemotherapy and radiotherapy sidelined him for most of 2013, delaying the record release. Deep Deep Love features minimalist backing of double bass by Dean Schulz Layla and Rhianna Fibbins on backing vocals and Grieving Widow's alumni Chris Brodie and David Nicholls on guitar and drums respectively.

In June 2014, Brodie entered St Charles Recording Studio in Northcote with the Grieving Widows to record a song from their live set; a cover of Ian Rilen’s (Rose Tattoo/Love Addicts) "Booze to Blame". Three more songs of original material quickly followed, and Run Yourself Ragged EP was released.

2015-2016: Big Hearted Lovin Man: A Retrospective 1999-2014
In March 2015, Brodie released the live album, Big Hearted Lovin' Man: A Retrospective 1999-2014. The album was recorded in one night in January, 2015 at Salt Studios in Melbourne. In April 2015, Brodie embarked on a three-month solo acoustic tour of Europe playing back to back shows at France.

2017: Lost Not Found and Funerária do Vale
In early 2017, Brodie returned to Melbourne to record Lost Not Found a collection of reinterpreted cover songs. 

Brodie's seventh studio album, Funerária do Vale was released on 30 August 2019. The album cover and title are taken from a photo that Brodie took of a funeral home in Rio De Janeiro, Brazil during a six month stay in 2007. He said "I found the imagery so evocative (with its English translation of 'Valley of the Funeral Home'), and always hoped to use it as an album cover. In a way I wrote the songs to fit the existing photograph, exploring themes of loss."

Discography

Studio albums

Live albums

Extended plays

Awards and nominations

ARIA Music Awards
The ARIA Music Awards is an annual awards ceremony that recognises excellence, innovation, and achievement across all genres of Australian music. They commenced in 1987.

! 
|-
| rowspan="2"| 2002
| rowspan="2"| Empty Arms Broken Hearts
| ARIA Award for Breakthrough Artist - Album
| 
| rowspan="2"|
|-
| ARIA Award for Best Male Artist
| 
|-

References

1974 births
Living people
Australian singer-songwriters
Musicians from Melbourne
Place of birth missing (living people)
21st-century Australian singers
21st-century Australian male singers
Australian male singer-songwriters